Heinrich Révy (8 August 1883 – 10 March 1949) was an Austrian painter. His work was part of the painting event in the art competition at the 1928 Summer Olympics.

References

1883 births
1949 deaths
20th-century Austrian painters
Austrian male painters
Olympic competitors in art competitions
People from Kneževo, Bosnia and Herzegovina
20th-century Austrian male artists